The following Union Army units and commanders fought in the Battle of Chancellorsville of the American Civil War. The Confederate order of battle is listed separately. Order of battle compiled from the army organization during the battle, the casualty returns and the reports.

Abbreviations used

Military rank
 MG = Major General
 BG = Brigadier General
 Col = Colonel
 Ltc = Lieutenant Colonel
 Maj = Major
 Cpt = Captain
 Lt = Lieutenant

Other
 w = wounded
 mw = mortally wounded
 k = killed
 c = captured

Army of the Potomac

MG Joseph Hooker

General Staff and Headquarters

General Staff:
 Chief of Staff: MG Daniel Butterfield
 Assistant Adjutant General: BG Seth Williams
 Chief Quartermaster: BG Rufus Ingalls
 Chief of Engineers: BG Gouverneur K. Warren
 Bureau of Military Information: Col George H. Sharpe
 Medical Director: Maj Jonathan Letterman

General Headquarters:

Command of the Provost-Marshal-General: BG Marsena R. Patrick
 93rd New York: Col John S. Crocker
 8th United States, Companies A, B, C, D, F, and G: Cpt Edwin W. H. Read
 6th Pennsylvania Cavalry, Companies E and I: Cpt James Starr
 Detachment Regular Cavalry: Lt Tattnall Paulding

Patrick's Brigade: Col William F. Rogers
 21st New York: Ltc Chester W. Steinberg
 23rd New York: Col Henry C. Hoffman
 35th New York: Col John G. Todd
 80th New York (20th Militia): Col Theodore B. Gates
 Maryland Light Artillery, Battery B: Cpt Alonzo Snow
 Ohio Light Artillery, 12th Battery: Cpt Aaron C. Johnson

Engineer Brigade: BG Henry W. Benham
 15th New York Engineer: Col Clinton G. Colgate
 50th New York Engineer:  Col Charles B. Stuart
 United States Engineer Battalion: Cpt Chauncey B. Reese

Signal Corps: Cpt Samuel T. Cushing

Ordnance Detachment: Lt John R. Edie, Jr.

Guards and Orderlies:
 Oneida (New York) Cavalry: Cpt Daniel P. Mann

I Corps

MG John F. Reynolds

Chief of Artillery: Col Charles S. Wainwright

Escort:
 1st Maine Cavalry, Company L: Cpt Constantine Taylor

II Corps

MG Darius N. Couch

Chief of Artillery and Assistant Inspector-General: Ltc Charles H. Morgan

Escort:
 6th New York Cavalry, Companies D and K: Cpt Riley Johnson

III Corps

MG Daniel Sickles

Chief of Artillery: Cpt George E. Randolph

V Corps

MG George Meade

Chief of Artillery: Cpt Stephen H. Weed

Escort:
 17th Pennsylvania Cavalry (2 companies): Cpt William Thompson

VI Corps

MG John Sedgwick

Chief of Artillery: Col Charles H. Tompkins

Escort: Maj Hugh H. Janeway
 1st New Jersey Cavalry, Company L: Lt Voorhees Dye
 1st Pennsylvania Cavalry, Company H: Cpt William S. Craft

XI Corps

MG Oliver O. Howard

Chief of Artillery: Ltc Louis Schirmer

Escort:
 1st Indiana Cavalry, Companies I and K: Cpt Abram Sharra

XII Corps

MG Henry W. Slocum

Chief of Artillery: Cpt Clermont L. Best

Provost Guard:
 10th Maine Battalion (3 companies): Cpt John D. Beardsley

Cavalry Corps

BG George Stoneman

Artillery
BG Henry J. Hunt

Notes

References
 Eicher, John H., and David J. Eicher. Civil War High Commands. Stanford, CA: Stanford University Press, 2001. .
 Sears, Stephen W. Chancellorsville. Boston: Houghton Mifflin, 1996. .
 U.S. War Department, The War of the Rebellion: a Compilation of the Official Records of the Union and Confederate Armies, U.S. Government Printing Office, 1880–1901.

American Civil War orders of battle